is a former Japanese football player.

Club statistics

References

External links

1986 births
Living people
Association football people from Chiba Prefecture
Japanese footballers
J1 League players
Singapore Premier League players
JEF United Chiba players
Albirex Niigata Singapore FC players
Briobecca Urayasu players
Association football defenders
Japanese expatriate footballers